The 1979–80 Wisconsin Badgers men's basketball team represented the University of Wisconsin–Madison in the 1979–80 NCAA Division I men's basketball season. The head coach was Bill Cofield, coaching his forth season with the Badgers. The team played their home games at the UW Fieldhouse in Madison, Wisconsin and was a member of the Big Ten Conference.

Guard Wes Matthews was the team's leading scorer with 549 points in 28 games. Other statistical leaders included forward Joe Chrnelich with 209 rebounds and Danny Hastings with 72 assists.

Late in the season, coach Cofield suspended Matthews for arguing with a coach, a decision that was believed to have cost the Badgers an invitation to play in the National Invitation Tournament. Cofield said of his decision: "The young man had to be taught a lesson. While we may have had a shot at postseason play, the basketball program at Wisconsin is more important than whether we win or lose a game."

Roster

Schedule

Team players drafted into the NBA

References 

Wisconsin
Wisconsin Badgers men's basketball seasons
Badge
Badge